Moderate nationalism is a moderate version of nationalism. It is less demanding than classical nationalism and has several subtypes such as civic nationalism (also known as liberal nationalism). Moderate nationalism is similar to patriotism, although they remain different, as moderate nationalism is still focused on cultural and ethnic issues while patriotism puts more value on forming a civic community and being loyal to the state.

Moderate nationalism has had a relevant role in the history of Irish nationalism and Indian nationalism.

South Korean liberals are more support immigrant rights and foreign voting rights than South Korean conservatives. Liberals more friendly to immigrant and naturalized people than conservatives, though the liberals stimulates ethnic sentiment to resist neighboring powers and promote Sunshine Policy peaceful diplomatic relations with North Korea. For this reason, South Korean liberals and liberal movements are considered "moderate nationalist".

Some American opinion articles have also called for the adoption of moderate nationalism by the society of the United States of today.

See also
 Political moderate

References

Nationalism